Hermann August Krauss (1 August 1848 – 21 April 1939) was an Austrian entomologist who specialised in Orthoptera and Dermaptera.

 
Krauss was a physician. His collection is in the Naturhistorisches Museum in Vienna.

Selected publications
1877. Orthopteren vom Senegal. Anzeiger der Kaiserlichen Akademie der Wissenschaften. Mathematisch-Naturwissenschaftliche Klasse, Wien, 14, no. xvi : 141-145.
1878. Orthopteren vom Senegal gesammelt von Dr. Frantz Steindachner. Sitzungsberichte der Kaiserlichen Akademie der Wissenschaften. Mathematisch-Naturwissenschaftliche Klasse, Wien, (incorrectly dated 1877), 76 (1) : 29-63, 2 pl.
1890. Erklärung der Orthopteren-Tafeln J. C. Savigny’s in der "Description de l’Égypte". Aus der Literatur zusammengestellt und mit Bemerkungen Versehen. Verhandlungen der zoologisch-botanischen Gesellschaft in Wien, 40 : 227-272.
1891. Beitrag zur Kenntniss westafrikanischer Orthopteren. 2. Orthopteren der Guinea-Inseln São Thomé und Rolas, gesammelt von Prof. Dr. Richard Greeff. Zoologische Jahrbücher (Systematik)(incorrectly dated 1890), 5 : 647-668, pl. 45.
1892. Systematisches Verzeichnis der canarischen Dermapteren und Orthopteren mit Diagnosen der neuen Gattungen und Arten.Zoologischer Anzeiger, Jena, 15 (no.390) : 163-171.
1902. Die namen der ältesten Dermapteren-(Orthopteren-) Gattungen und ihre Verwendung für Familien- und Unterfamilien-Benennungen auf Grund der jetzigen Nomenclaturregeln. Zoologischer Anzeiger, Jena, 25 (no. 676) : 530-543.
1902. Beitrag zur Kenntniss der Orthopterenfauna der Sahara. Verhandlungen der zoologisch-botanischen Gesellschaft in Wien, 52 (4) : 230-254.
1902 Diagnosen neuer Orthopteren aus Südarabien und von der Insel Sokotra. Anzeiger der Kaiserlichen Akademie der Wissenschaften. Mathematisch-Naturwissenschaftliche Klasse, Wien, 39 : 53-58.
1909. Dermaptera und Orthoptera aus Ägypten, der Halbinsel Sinai, Palästina und Syrien und Syrien. In Kneucher A., Zoologische Ergebnisse zweier in den Jahren 1902 und 1904 durch die Sinai-halbinsel botanischen Studiereisen. Verhandlungen des Naturwissenchaftlichen Vereins in Karlsruhe, 21 : 99-119, 12 fig.

References
Kaltenbach, A. P. 2003. Die Orthopterensammlung des Naturhistorischen Museums in Wien und ihre Geschichte. Denisia 8 57-61, 2 Photos. 
Nonveiller, G. 1999. The Pioneers of the research on the Insects of Dalmatia. Zagreb, Hrvatski Pridodoslovni Muzej : 1-390.

1848 births
1939 deaths
Austrian entomologists